The Lebanon Billie Jean King Cup team represents Lebanon in the Billie Jean King Cup tennis competition and are governed by the Fédération Libaniase de Tennis.  They have not competed since 2018.

History
Lebanon competed in its first Fed Cup in 1993.  They have lost both of their ties to date.

See also
Fed Cup
Lebanon Davis Cup team

External links

Billie Jean King Cup teams
Fed Cup
Fed Cup